The World War I Memorial, also known as the Veterans Memorial, is a relief sculpture and war memorial by artist Frederic Littman and architect Pietro Belluschi, installed of the exterior of Salem, Oregon's Marion County Courthouse, in the United States. The marble sculpture was dedicated in 1954 and depicts a grieving woman kneeling and holding a wreath. Viesko & Post served as the contractor of the project. The sculpture was deemed "well maintained" during the Smithsonian Institution's "Save Outdoor Sculpture!" program in July 1993.

See also

 1954 in art

References

External links
 

1954 establishments in Oregon
1954 sculptures
Marble sculptures in Oregon
Military monuments and memorials in the United States
Monuments and memorials in Salem, Oregon
Outdoor sculptures in Salem, Oregon
Sculptures of women in Oregon
World War I memorials in the United States